In a Doghouse is a compilation album of Throwing Muses' early music. It was released as a double CD in 1998. The title refers to their 1985 self-distributed The Doghouse Cassette.

Track listing

Disc one
Throwing Muses (1986)
 "Call Me"  – 3:58
 "Green"  – 3:04
 "Hate My Way"  – 4:05
 "Vicky's Box"  – 5:08
 "Rabbits Dying"  – 3:48
 "America"  – 2:46
 "Fear"  – 2:44
 "Stand Up"  – 2:56
 "Soul Soldier"  – 5:10
 "Delicate Cutters"  – 3:54
Chains Changed EP (1987)
<li> "Finished"  – 3:50
<li> "Reel"  – 2:47
<li> "Snail Head"  – 2:37
<li> "Cry Baby Cry"  – 4:23

Disc two
The Doghouse Cassette (1985)
 "Call Me"  – 4:06
 "Sinkhole"  – 2:33
 "Green"  – 3:22
 "Hate My Way"  – 3:53
 "Vicky's Box"  – 5:11
 "America (She Can't Say No)"  – 2:44
 "Fear"  – 3:03
 "Raise The Roses"  – 3:45
 "And A She Wolf After The War"  – 3:15
 "Fish"  – 4:43
Written in 1983 recorded in 1996
<li> "Catch"  – 3:03
<li> "Lizzie Sage"  – 3:26
<li> "Clear And Great"  – 2:47
<li> "Doghouse"  – 1:32
<li> "People"  – 2:25 
This CD is enhanced with the "Fish" video in QuickTime format.

References

Throwing Muses albums
1998 compilation albums
4AD compilation albums